Bryan Keith Reynolds Jr. (born June 28, 2001) is an American professional soccer player who plays as a right-back for Belgian Pro League club Westerlo, on loan from Serie A club Roma.

Club career
After playing with the FC Dallas academy, Reynolds became the club's youngest ever Homegrown Player on November 23, 2016, when he signed a contract with the first-team. Although he played with the Dallas academy as a forward, Reynolds was used as a fullback with the Dallas first team.

Reynolds was on loan to North Texas SC in March 2019. Reynolds made his FC Dallas debut on May 19, 2019, against Los Angeles FC. He recorded his first career assist on May 25 against Vancouver Whitecaps FC. On August 27, 2019, Reynolds scored his first professional goal for North Texas SC in a match against Tormenta FC.

On September 23, 2020, Reynolds signed a four-year contract with FC Dallas. In October 2020, he was ranked in Major League Soccer's "22 Under 22" rankings.

On February 1, 2021, Reynolds joined Serie A club Roma on an initial 6-month loan with an obligation to buy.

Having seen limited minutes, Reynolds was loaned to Kortrijk in Belgium for five months in January 2022.

On June 21, 2022, Reynolds moved on a season-long loan to another Belgian club, Westerlo.

International career
Reynolds was named to the United States under-17 team roster for the 2017 FIFA U-17 World Cup.

He received his first call up to the senior United States squad in March 2021. On March 28, 2021, Reynolds made his debut for the senior national team in a friendly against Northern Ireland.

Career statistics

Club

International

References

External links 
 
 
 

2001 births
Living people
American soccer players
United States men's youth international soccer players
United States men's international soccer players
Association football fullbacks
FC Dallas players
North Texas SC players
A.S. Roma players
K.V. Kortrijk players
K.V.C. Westerlo players
Soccer players from Texas
Sportspeople from Fort Worth, Texas
USL League One players
Major League Soccer players
Homegrown Players (MLS)
Serie A players
Belgian Pro League players
American expatriate soccer players
American expatriate sportspeople in Italy
Expatriate footballers in Italy
American expatriate sportspeople in Belgium
Expatriate footballers in Belgium